Public holidays in the Republic of Moldova refer to the celebrated non-working days established by the Government of Moldova and valid for the whole territory of the country. Autonomous territorial units Gagauzia and Transnistria, as well cities, communes and cantonal authorities also establish local holidays, which are, however, not non-working days. There are 14 nationally celebrated holidays in the modern Moldova. Most holidays celebrated in the Republic of Moldova recognize events or people from Moldovan history. Most retail businesses close on New Year's and Independence Day, but remain open on all other holidays. Private businesses often observe only the big holidays such as New Year's Day, Easter Monday, Victory Day, Independence Day, Labour Day, Limba noastră, and Christmas.

The holiday season in the winter traditionally ran between New Year's Day until Old new Year's Day. As of 2009, the holiday season now officially begins with Western Christmas on 25 December, now a legal holiday in the Republic of Moldova. The holiday seasons gets underway much earlier with the official lighting of the capital city Chișinău's Christmas tree at the end of November or very beginning of December, when other than Christmas, some locals celebrate Winter solstice, Hanukkah, and Kwanzaa. The Summer holiday season traditionally (though unofficially) starts in May with celebrations of anniversary of most important localities (Bălți, 21 May) and culminates in the end of August with the celebrations of Independence Day and Limba noastră.

National holidays
These holidays are designated by the Government of the Republic of Moldova, in accordance with the legislation of the country.

Other observances

In addition to the holidays, mentioned above, the following days are observed:

Local holidays
In addition to the national holidays, cities, communes and cantonal authorities observe the following holidays:

See also

Public holidays in Romania
Public holidays in Transnistria

References

External links
 World travel Guide - Moldova Public Holidays

 
Moldova
Holidays